Orcières-Merlette, also known as Orcières Merlette 1850, is a ski resort near to Orcières, Hautes-Alpes, in the French Alps. It has been a summit finish for Tour de France stages on multiple occasions, most notably in 1971, when Luis Ocaña beat Eddy Merckx by over eight minutes to take the yellow jersey as leader of the general classification.

Location and resort details
It lies above the town of Gap.

History
Orcières-Merlette was built in the 1960s, and opened in 1962. Skiers who have used Orcières-Merlette as their home location include Valentin Giraud Moine and Alizée Baron. French rally driver Sébastien Ogier has also worked as a ski instructor at Orcières-Merlette. 

In 2019, Orcières-Merlette hosted a "colour" skiing event, which involved being sprayed with coloured powders whilst skiing down the mountain. A 2020 Alpine Skiing Europa Cup Super-G event scheduled to be held at Orcières-Merlette was cancelled due to heavy snowfall and lack of visibility.

Tour de France

Orcières-Merlette was first used as a Tour de France stage host in 1971 edition, when it was used for the finish of stage 11 and the start of stage 12, including the rest day in between the stages. Luis Ocaña won stage 11, attacking from a group of leading contenders and soloing for the final . He also gained the yellow jersey as leader of the general classification with a finishing margin of 8:42 minutes over the former leader Eddy Merckx. Merckx had won the previous year's race. Following the rest day, stage 12 of the 1971 Tour started with a descent from Orcières-Merlette, which Merckx attacked on with a small group and remained in the lead to the finish in Marseille. Ocaña led the chasing peloton (main field) to limit his loss to Merckx on the stage to two minutes.
 
The Tour returned to Orcières-Merlette the following year when it was again used across a rest day. Lucien Van Impe took victory at Orcières-Merlette in the initial stage 11. The next time Orcières-Merlette was visited by the Tour was ten years later in 1982, when it was used for the finish of stage 15, won by Pascal Simon, before hosting the start of the next stage.

Orcières-Merlette featured in the 1989 Tour as the finish of stage 15's individual time trial, which was won by Steven Rooks. The yellow jersey was taken by Greg LeMond, in a Tour considered to be one of the greatest in the race's history. The stage also included an ascent of the Col de Manse mountain pass, which stands between Gap and Orcières-Merlette.

Orcières-Merlette was the summit finish of stage 4 of the 2020 Tour, the first time that the race had ascended the mountain in 31 years. The climb had a reasonably consistent gradient, and features many hairpin turns. It was one of two summit finishes on the first week of the Tour, the other being Mont Aigoual. The stage was won by Slovenian Primož Roglič in a sprint finish.

References

Bibliography

External links

 

Ski areas and resorts in France
Tourist attractions in Hautes-Alpes
Sports venues in Hautes-Alpes
Climbs in cycle racing in France